Maria Lambrou (also known as Maroula Lambrou-Teloni or Greek: Μαρούλα Λάμπρου-Τελώνη,) born 23 February 1953 in Limassol, Cyprus, is a Greek-Cypriot athlete, best known as a long jumper. Lambrou is regarded by many as the greatest female athlete in Cypriot sports. Her personal best of 6.80 m in the long jump, achieved on 24 May 1985 and personal best of 5319 points in heptathlon achieved on 3–4 September 1984 in Cyprus, are the national records.

Lambrou participated three times in the Olympics: the 1976 Summer Olympics (representing Greece), 1980 Summer Olympics (representing Greece) and the 1988 Olympics (representing Cyprus). At that time, she held six national records in Cyprus (100 m, 200 m, 100 m hurdles, long jump, heptathlon, and high jump) and three national records in Greece (long jump, 100 m, and 100 m hurdles). Lambrou also holds the national record for indoor long jump (6.42 m), achieved on 7 February 1976 in Piraeus, Greece. Representing Cyprus, she placed 6th in the long jump at the 1982 Commonwealth Games in Brisbane.
 
In 1985, at the Games of the Small States of Europe in San Marino, Lambrou broke five Cypriot records and won several medals. She jumped 6.80 m in the long jump, ran the 100 m in a time of 11.73 seconds, scored 5,062 in the heptathlon, finished the 200 m with a time of 24.39 seconds, and ran on the 4 x 100 metres relay team, which finished in 46.53 seconds, a Cypriot record. At those same games, she won the gold in the 100 m event with a time of 12.04 seconds and in the long jump with a leap of 6.30 m. At the Bruno Zauli Cup in Austria, Lambrou won the 100 m event.

References

External links

1953 births
Living people
Sportspeople from Limassol
Greek female long jumpers
Cypriot female long jumpers
Cypriot female sprinters
Mediterranean Games gold medalists for Greece
Athletes (track and field) at the 1979 Mediterranean Games
Olympic athletes of Greece
Olympic athletes of Cyprus
Athletes (track and field) at the 1976 Summer Olympics
Athletes (track and field) at the 1980 Summer Olympics
Athletes (track and field) at the 1988 Summer Olympics
Commonwealth Games competitors for Cyprus
Athletes (track and field) at the 1982 Commonwealth Games
Greek Cypriot people
Mediterranean Games medalists in athletics